This is a list of colleges in Quebec, sorted by type.

Public colleges 
Cégep de l'Abitibi-Témiscamingue, Rouyn-Noranda
Collège Ahuntsic, Ahuntsic, Montreal
Collège d'Alma, Alma
Cégep André-Laurendeau, LaSalle, Montreal
Cégep de Baie-Comeau, Baie-Comeau
Cégep Beauce-Appalaches, Saint-Georges
Collège de Bois-de-Boulogne, Cartierville, Montreal
Champlain Regional College
Saint Lambert Campus, Saint-Lambert, Longueuil
Saint Lawrence Campus, Sainte-Foy, Quebec City
Lennoxville Campus, Lennoxville, Sherbrooke
Cégep de Chicoutimi, Chicoutimi, Saguenay
Dawson College, Westmount, Montreal
Cégep de Drummondville, Drummondville
Cégep Édouard-Montpetit, Vieux-Longueuil, Longueuil
École nationale d'aérotechnique
Cégep Garneau, La Cité, Quebec City
Cégep de la Gaspésie et des Îles, Gaspé
Collège Gérald-Godin, Sainte-Geneviève, Montreal
Cégep de Granby-Haute-Yamaska, Granby
Heritage College, Hull, Gatineau
John Abbott College, Sainte-Anne-de-Bellevue, Montreal
Cégep de Jonquière, Jonquière, Saguenay
Cégep de La Pocatière, La Pocatière
Cégep régional de Lanaudière
Joliette Campus, Joliette
L'Assomption Campus, L'Assomption
Terrebonne Campus, Terrebonne
Cégep de Lévis, Lévis
Cégep Limoilou, Limoilou, Quebec City
Collège Lionel-Groulx, Sainte-Thérèse
Collège de Maisonneuve, Hochelaga-Maisonneuve, Montreal
Cégep Marie-Victorin, Rivière-des-Prairies, Montreal
Cégep de Matane, Matane
Collège Montmorency, Laval
Cégep de l'Outaouais, Hull, Gatineau
Cégep de Rimouski, Rimouski
Cégep de Rivière-du-Loup, Rivière-du-Loup
Collège de Rosemont, Rosemont, Montreal
Cégep de Saint-Félicien, Saint-Félicien
Cégep de Saint-Hyacinthe, Saint-Hyacinthe
Cégep de Saint-Jean-sur-Richelieu, Saint-Jean-sur-Richelieu
Cégep de Saint-Jérôme, Saint-Jérôme
Cégep de Saint-Laurent, Saint-Laurent, Montreal
Cégep de Sainte-Foy, Sainte-Foy, Quebec City 
Cégep de Sept-Îles, Sept-Îles
Collège Shawinigan, Shawinigan
Cégep de Sherbrooke, 2e arrondissement, Sherbrooke
Cégep de Sorel-Tracy, Sorel-Tracy
Cégep de Thetford, Thetford Mines
Cégep de Trois-Rivières, Trois-Rivières
Collège de Valleyfield, Salaberry-de-Valleyfield
Vanier College, Saint-Laurent, Montreal
Cégep de Victoriaville, Victoriaville
Cégep du Vieux Montréal, Ville-Marie (Quartier Latin), Montreal
Kiuna Institute

Private subsidized colleges 
 TAV College  (Montreal)
 Teccart Institut  (Downtown, and Brossard)
 Campus Notre-Dame-de-Foy (Saint-Augustin-de-Desmaures)
 Collège André-Grasset, including the Institut Grasset, both located in (Montreal)
 Collège Bart (Quebec City)
 Centennial College (Montreal)
 Collège Jean-de-Brébeuf (Montreal)
 Collegial Sainte-Anne, related to the Collège Sainte-Anne de Lachine (Montreal)
 Collège Laflèche (Trois-Rivières)
 LaSalle College (Montreal)
 Marianopolis College (Montreal)
 Collège International Marie de France (Montreal)
 Collège Mérici (Quebec City)
 Collège International des Marcellines (Westmount)
 Conservatoire Lassalle (Montreal)
 O'Sullivan College of Montreal (Montreal)
 Collège O'Sullivan de Québec
Herzing College (Montreal)
Collège Universel - Campus Gatineau (Gatineau)
Collège Supérieur de Montréal (Montréal)
 Collège Stanislas (Outremont)
 École de musique Vincent d'Indy (Outremont) (named after Vincent d'Indy)
 National Circus School (Montreal)
 Teccart Institute (Montreal), including its Longueuil and Brossard campuses
 Séminaire de Sherbrooke (Sherbrooke)
 École de sténographie judiciaire (Montreal)
 École du show-business (Montreal)
 Recording Arts Canada (Montreal)
 Trebas Institute (Montreal)
 Musitechnic services éducatifs (Montreal)

Private colleges under licence 
 College Avalon (Montreal)
Académie de l'entrepreneurship Québécois (Saint-Hubert)
 Les Ateliers de danse moderne de Montréal (Montreal)
 Collège Marsan (Montreal)
 Canada College  (Montreal)
 Collège April-Fortier (Montreal)
 Collège de l'Estrie (Sherbrooke)
 CDI College (Montreal), Laval, Longueuil, Pointe-Claire and Quebec City)
 Herzing College (Montreal)
 Collège de l'immobilier du Québec (Verdun)
 Inter-Dec College (Montreal)
Collège Kensley (Montreal)
 Collège MultiHexa
 Collège La Cabriole (Saint-Jean-sur-Richelieu)
 Collège d'enseignement en immobilier (Montreal)
 Collège radio télévision de Québec (Quebec City)
 Collège Salette (Montreal)
 Montreal Technical College (Montreal)
 École de danse de Québec (Quebec City)
 École nationale de l'humour (Montreal) 
 National Theatre School of Canada (Montreal)
 Institut supérieur d'informatique (Montreal)
 M College of Canada (Montreal)
 Matrix College of Management, Technology and Healthcare (Montreal)
 Montreal College of Information Technology (Montreal)
 Ultra College of Montreal (Montreal)

Colleges part of the government network or belonging to a university 
 Conservatoire de musique de Saguenay (Chicoutimi)
 Conservatoire de musique de Gatineau (Hull)
 Conservatoire de musique du Québec à Montréal (Montreal)
 Conservatoire de musique du Québec à Québec (Quebec City)
 Conservatoire de musique de Rimouski (Rimouski)
 Conservatoire de musique du Québec à Trois-Rivières (Trois-Rivières)
 Conservatoire de musique de Val-d'Or (Val-d'Or)
 Institut de technologie agroalimentaire
 Campus La Pocatière (La Pocatière)
 Campus Saint-Hyacinthe (Saint-Hyacinthe)
 Institut de tourisme et d'hôtellerie du Québec (Montreal)
 Macdonald College, run under McGill University (Sainte-Anne-de-Bellevue)
Royal Military College Saint-Jean (Saint-Jean-sur-Richelieu)

See also 
List of universities in Canada
List of colleges in Canada
List of business schools in Canada
List of law schools in Canada
List of Canadian universities by endowment
Higher education in Canada
Higher education in Quebec
College education in Quebec
CEGEP
Education in Quebec
Quebec

External links
 Établissements d'enseignement collégial  Province of Quebec's Ministry of Education, Leisure and Sports' listing of institutions of college education

 
Quebec
 
Colleges in Quebec, List of